Rhochmopterum hirsutum is a species of tephritid or fruit flies in the genus Rhochmopterum of the family Tephritidae.

Distribution
Mozambique.

References

Tephritinae
Insects described in 1933
Diptera of Africa